Elías Piña is a westernmost province which composing one of the 32 provinces of the Dominican Republic. It is divided into 6 municipalities and its capital city is Comendador. It is bordered by the provinces of Dajabón to the north-west, Santiago Rodríguez to the north-east, San Juan to the east, Independencia to the south and the Nord-Est department of Haiti to the west.

It was created on 1942 with the name San Rafael. In 1965, its name was changed to Estrelleta and, finally, in 1972 it got its current name. It was a municipio of the San Juan province before being elevated to the category of province.

Location
The Elías Piña province has the Dajabón and Santiago Rodríguez provinces to the north, the San Juan province to the east, the Independencia province to the south and the Republic of Haiti to the west.

Origin of name
Elías Piña was an officer of the Dominican army during the Dominican-Haitian War. He was born in La Margarita, close to Comendador and died in 1845 when he was attacking a fortified position in Bánica.

History

Municipalities
In the province, there are six municipalities (municipios) and seven municipal districts (distrito municipal) within them. The municipalities and its municipal districts (M.D.) are:

 Comendador, head municipality of the province
 Guayabo (M.D.)
 Sabana Larga (M.D.)
 Bánica
 Sabana Cruz (M.D.)
 Sabana Higüero (M.D.)
 El Llano
 Guanito (M.D.)
 Hondo Valle
 Rancho de la Guardia (M.D.)
 Juan Santiago
 Pedro Santana
 Río Limpio (M.D.)

Population
The following is a sortable table of the municipalities and municipal districts with population figures as of the 2014 estimate. Urban population are those living in the seats (cabeceras literally heads) of municipalities or of municipal districts. Rural population are those living in the districts (Secciones literally sections) and neighborhoods (Parajes literally places) outside them. The population figures are from the 2014 population estimate.

Geography
The Cordillera Central ("Central mountain chain") is found in the northern part of the province, and the Sierra de Neiba runs across the southern half. Between those two mountain ranges, there are several valleys formed by the Artibonite River and its tributaries.

Climate
The climate of the province is a tropical climate, hot most of the year, but it is cooler on the mountains.

Rivers
The main river is the Artibonite that, in some places, marks the Dominican-Haitian border. Other rivers are Macasías, Tocino, Joca and Vallecito, all of them tributaries of the Artibonite.

Economy 
As in all border provinces in the Dominican Republic, there is little economic development. The trade with Haiti is important, above all in Comendador. On the mountains, coffee and beans are important products. Potatoes are also produced in the south (Sierra de Neiba).

References

 
Provinces of the Dominican Republic
States and territories established in 1942